Cybaeus reticulatus is a species of true spider in the family Cybaeidae. It is found in the United States and Canada. It was first described by Eugène Simon.

References

Cybaeidae
Articles created by Qbugbot
Spiders described in 1886